Spodnji Hotič (in older sources also Spodnje Hotiče) is a settlement on the left bank of the Sava River north of Litija in central Slovenia. The area is part of the traditional region of Upper Carniola and is now included with the rest of the Municipality of Litija in the Central Sava Statistical Region.

References

External links
Spodnji Hotič on Geopedia

Populated places in the Municipality of Litija